The H. W. Smith Building (also known as the Smith Arcade) is a historic site in Punta Gorda, Florida, United States. It is located at 121 East Marion Avenue and was added to the National Register of Historic Places in 1991.

References

External links
 Charlotte County listings at National Register of Historic Places
 Florida's Office of Cultural and Historical Programs
 Charlotte County listings
 H.W. Smith Building

Punta Gorda, Florida
National Register of Historic Places in Charlotte County, Florida
Buildings and structures completed in 1926
1926 establishments in Florida